The Kahl Building is an historic building located in Downtown Davenport, Iowa, United States. It was listed on the National Register of Historic Places in 1983. In 2020 it was included as a contributing property in the Davenport Downtown Commercial Historic District. The building also includes the Capitol Theatre.

Kahl Building

It was designed by Davenport architect Arthur Ebeling who used as inspiration the works of Chicago architects William Holabird, John Root and Louis Sullivan. In fact Sullivan's Wainwright Building in St. Louis is considered a model after which the Kahl Building was designed. Sullivan's influence can be seen in the more elaborate ornamentation on the lower floors while the upper floors are relatively plain. Their decoration is confined to recessed spandrel panels. The building is capped with a staccato pairing of round-arch windows and an elaborate cornice.

In 1920, the building was constructed by Henry Kahl and Walsh-Kahl Construction for $1.5 million. It was considered high-quality office space, which was in demand at the time, and was fully leased before construction was complete. The building is composed of steel frame construction with stone and decorative terra cotta facing materials. The building's sense of height is highlighted by recessing the spandrel panels between the floors and behind the vertical piers. It is considered an "exceptional example of the influence of the Chicago School on commercial architecture." Historically, the building has contained 184 office suites, several retail shops, a restaurant, and the Capital Theater. The lobby walls were faced with Alabama marble that is swirled in pinks, and it featured bronze and copper doors.

In 1994 the family of Davenport Banker V.O. Figge and his wife Elizabeth, who was Henry Kahl's daughter, donated the building to the Scott Community College Foundation, which used it for academic purposes. The Eastern Iowa Community College District announced in August 2014 their intention to leave the Kahl Building and relocate to a new campus in the former First Federal Savings and Loan Association Building and First Midwest Bank building on West Third Street between Brady and Main streets. The new college campus was opened in January 2018, and the Kahl Building was sold to Jim Bergman of JNB Capitol Building for $2 million in June. A $20 million project will renovate the Kahl Building into 70 market-rate apartments.

Capitol Theatre

The Capitol Theatre opened on December 25, 1920. Builder Henry C. Kahl wanted to provide a 2,500-seat, palace-type theater. Kahl planned a luxurious movie theater larger than any in Davenport or Iowa. When opened, the theater boasted grand pianos, gold leaf decoration, and several chandeliers. Its interior was designed by the Chicago firm of Rapp & Rapp. The original pipe organ was built by the M. P. Moller Pipe Organ Company. It was replaced by a Wicks pipe organ for $30,000 and contains 700 pipes. The organ received a $75,000 restoration in 2000, and it is now the only Wicks theater organ that remains in its original home. In 1925, a 7-story stage house and stage expansion were constructed. It was designed by the Davenport architectural firm of Clausen & Kruse. Priester Construction Company of Davenport was the general contractor. The theater joined the Radio-Keith-Orpheum (RKO) circuit in 1927. It discontinued operating as a working movie theater in 1977 and was the last of the city's movie palaces in operation at the time.

A variety of performers have performed on its stage including vaudeville shows. It hosted the Winter Dance Party in 1959 that included Buddy Holly, the Big Bopper, and Ritchie Valens before their deaths five days later in an airplane crash outside of Clear Lake, Iowa. The Capitol currently has a capacity of 2,000 seats but is no longer in operation. The Kahl Building's renovation includes the Capitol Theatre whose planned use will be for small concerts, plays, comedians, and movies.

References

Office buildings completed in 1920
Buildings and structures in Davenport, Iowa
Office buildings on the National Register of Historic Places in Iowa
Theatres on the National Register of Historic Places in Iowa
National Register of Historic Places in Davenport, Iowa
Individually listed contributing properties to historic districts on the National Register in Iowa
Skyscraper office buildings in Iowa
Skyscrapers in Iowa
Chicago school architecture in Iowa
1920 establishments in Iowa